Stefan I was a Bulgarian prelate. He was elected Metropolitan of Sofia in 1922 and, from 1945, also served as Exarch of the Bulgarian Orthodox Church. He actively contributed to the rescue of the Bulgarian Jews in World War II. He was awarded Order of the White Eagle and other decorations.

Sources

1878 births
1957 deaths
Bishops of the Bulgarian Orthodox Church
Bulgarian Righteous Among the Nations
Eastern Orthodox Righteous Among the Nations
Exarchs of Bulgaria